Tejutepeque is a municipality in the Cabañas department of El Salvador located in the northeast, with population 20,000 of people. 

Municipalities of the Cabañas Department